is a passenger railway station located in the city of Kuki, Saitama, Japan, operated by East Japan Railway Company (JR East). It is also a freight depot for the Japan Freight Railway Company (JR Freight)

Lines

Station layout
This station has two opposed side platforms, however, with an unusual layout in that the platforms are not on the same level. Utsunomiya-bound trains stop at a ground level side-platform serving one track. Ōmiya-bound trains stop at an elevated side-platform serving one track. The station is staffed.

Platforms

History
Higashi-Washinomiya Station opened on 15 April 1981 as a freight station, and opened for passenger service from 23 June 1982. With the privatization of JNR on 1 April 1987, the station came under the control of JR East.

Passenger statistics
In fiscal 2019, the station was used by an average of 9,750 passengers daily (boarding passengers only).

Surrounding area
 Higashi-Washinomiya Hyaku-Kannon Onsen

See also
 List of railway stations in Japan

References

External links

   JR East station information 

Railway stations in Saitama Prefecture
Railway stations in Japan opened in 1981
Tōhoku Main Line
Utsunomiya Line
Stations of Japan Freight Railway Company
Kuki, Saitama